The following is a list of the 195 communes of the Tarn-et-Garonne department of France.

The communes cooperate in the following intercommunalities (as of 2020):
Communauté d'agglomération Grand Montauban
Communauté de communes Coteaux et Plaines du Pays Lafrançaisain
Communauté de communes des Deux Rives (partly)
Communauté de communes Grand Sud Tarn-et-Garonne
Communauté de communes de la Lomagne Tarn-et-Garonnaise
Communauté de communes du Pays de Serres en Quercy
Communauté de communes du Quercy Caussadais
Communauté de communes du Quercy Rouergue et des gorges de l'Aveyron (partly)
Communauté de communes Quercy Vert-Aveyron
Communauté de communes Terres des Confluences

References

Tarn-et-Garonne